Matti Manninen (born 20 July 1992, in Pori) is a Finnish cyclist, who currently rides for Finnish amateur team GIF–Chebici.

Major results

2010
 1st  Road race, National Junior Road Championships
2012
 National Under-23 Road Championships
1st  Road race
3rd Time trial
2013
 National Under-23 Road Championships
1st  Time trial
1st  Road race
2014
 1st  Time trial, National Under-23 Road Championships
 5th Road race, UEC European Under-23 Road Championships
2015
 2nd Overall Baltic Chain Tour
1st Stage 1
2016
 1st  Overall Dookoła Mazowsza
1st Stage 2
 1st Stage 1 Tour of Szeklerland
 4th Scandinavian Race Uppsala
 7th Tour de Ribas
 9th Odessa Grand Prix
 10th Grand Prix of ISD
2017
 1st  Road race, National Road Championships
 1st Stage 3 Tour de Hongrie
 4th Scandinavian Race Uppsala

References

External links

1992 births
Living people
Finnish male cyclists
Sportspeople from Pori